Béthines is a commune in the Vienne department in the Nouvelle-Aquitaine region in western France.

Geography
The village lies in the middle of the commune, on the right bank of the Salleron, which forms part of the commune's southwestern border, then flows northward through the commune.

See also
Communes of the Vienne department

References

Communes of Vienne